Egyptian Second Division 2009–10 is the 2009–10 season of the Egyptian Second Division competition. A total of 48 teams are divided into 3 groups based on geographical distribution. The top team of each group promotes to the highest Egyptian football level (Egyptian Premier League), The Season started on Wednesday 23 September 2009 and ended on Wednesday 12 May 2010. This season witnessed the promotion of three teams that will play in the Premier League for their first time ever.

On 28 April 2010, Smouha became the first team to secure a promotion seat to the 2010–11 Egyptian Premier League. Smouha earned promotion in style after an incredible 7-1 win against Abu Qair Semad. A week later, Misr El-Maqasha followed Smouha to the Preimer league. It earned promotion after a 2-0 win against Wadi El Gedid FC at home ground. It was Wadi Degla that sealed the third promotion seat. Wadi Degla defeated Al-Sekka Al-Hadid 3-1 in the last week of the competition.

On the other hand, Al-Sekka Al-Hadid, the oldest club in the Middle East, failed to avoid relegation to the Egyptian Third Division.

Relegated from 2008–09 Egyptian Premier Division 

  Itesalat 14th   Joined Group B 
  Tersana 15th   Joined Group B 
  Al-Olympi 16th   Joined Group C

Promoted from 2008–09 Egyptian Third Division 

Tanta FC was playing in Group B in 2008–09 Second Division, but in Group C 2009–10 Second Division, that's why we have 4 teams promoted to Group B and 2 teams promoted to Group C in 2009–10 Season.

Promoted and relegated after 2009–10 Egyptian Second Division

Promoted to 2010–11 Egyptian Premier League 
  Misr El-Maqasha won the Egyptian Second Division (Group A)
  Wadi Degla won the Egyptian Second Division (Group B)
  Smouha won the Egyptian Second Division (Group C)

Relegated to 2010–11 Egyptian Third Division

League tables

Group A

Group B

Gomhoreyat Shepin, the team with the fewest points among the three, relegated directly to Third Division, while a play-off match was scheduled to be played on May 19 at Sekka El Hadeed Stadium in Cairo between Banha and Suez Cement. The match ended in a 1-0 victory for Suez Cement, so Banha joined both Gomhoreyat Shepin and Al-Sekka Al-Hadid to the Third Division.

Group C

Top 3 teams qualify for the 2010–11 Egyptian Premier League.
Bottom 3 teams from each group are relegated to the Egyptian Third Division for the 2010–11 season.

Results

Group A

Group B

Group C

References

External links
 The Egyptian Second Division Table 2009–10 Season
 RSSSF Second Level 2009–10
 All About Egyptian football
 All About Egyptian Players
 Best site about Egyptian Football
 RSSSF competition history
 Yallakora Egyptian Premier League schedule, match results, and match downloads.
 Filgoal Egyptian Premier League Live.

Egyptian Second Division seasons
2009–10 in Egyptian football
Egypt